The Auger effect or Auger−Meitner effect is a physical phenomenon in which the filling of an inner-shell vacancy of an atom is accompanied by the emission of an electron from the same atom. When a core electron is removed, leaving a vacancy, an electron from a higher energy level may fall into the vacancy, resulting in a release of energy. Although most often this energy is released in the form of an emitted photon, the energy can also be transferred to another electron, which is ejected from the atom; this second ejected electron is called an Auger electron.

Effect
The effect was first discovered by Lise Meitner in 1922; Pierre Victor Auger independently discovered the effect shortly after and is credited with the discovery in most of the scientific community.

Upon ejection, the kinetic energy of the Auger electron corresponds to the difference between the energy of the initial electronic transition into the vacancy and the ionization energy for the electron shell from which the Auger electron was ejected. These energy levels depend on the type of atom and the chemical environment in which the atom was located.

Auger electron spectroscopy involves the emission of Auger electrons by bombarding a sample with either X-rays or energetic electrons and measures the intensity of Auger electrons that result as a function of the Auger electron energy. The resulting spectra can be used to determine the identity of the emitting atoms and some information about their environment.

Auger recombination is a similar Auger effect which occurs in semiconductors. An electron and electron hole (electron-hole pair) can recombine giving up their energy to an electron in the conduction band, increasing its energy. The reverse effect is known as impact ionization.

The Auger effect can impact biological molecules such as DNA. Following the K-shell ionization of the component atoms of DNA, Auger electrons are ejected leading to damage of its sugar-phosphate backbone.

Discovery
The Auger emission process was observed and published in 1922 by Lise Meitner, an Austrian-Swedish physicist, as a side effect in her competitive search for the nuclear beta electrons with the British physicist Charles Drummond Ellis.

The French physicist Pierre Victor Auger independently discovered it in 1923 upon analysis of a Wilson cloud chamber experiment and it became the central part of his PhD work. High-energy X-rays were applied to ionize gas particles and observe photoelectric electrons. The observation of electron tracks that were independent of the frequency of the incident photon suggested a mechanism for electron ionization that was caused from an internal conversion of energy from a radiationless transition. Further investigation, and theoretical work using elementary quantum mechanics and transition rate/transition probability calculations, showed that the effect was a radiationless effect more than an internal conversion effect.

See also
Auger therapy
Charge carrier generation and recombination
Characteristic X-ray
Coster–Kronig transition
Electron capture
Radiative Auger effect

References

Atomic physics
Foundational quantum physics
Electron spectroscopy